Trench Neal Davis (born September 12, 1960) is an American former professional baseball player, born in Baltimore, Maryland, who played in 23 Major League games over a period of three seasons.

Career
Signed as an amateur free agent in 1980, Davis spent six season in the minor leagues prior to playing his first major league game with the Pittsburgh Pirates.  After playing 17 major league games over two seasons and seven years in the Pirates organization, he was released on October 15, 1986 and granted free agency.
Davis signed with the Atlanta Braves on November 17, 1986.  He played the majority of the 1987 season with the Braves minor league affiliated in Richmond before playing in 6 major league games.

External links

1960 births
Living people
African-American baseball players
American expatriate baseball players in Mexico
Atlanta Braves players
Baseball players from Baltimore
Ganaderos de Tabasco players
Gulf Coast Pirates players
Greenwood Pirates players
Hawaii Islanders players
Lynn Sailors players
Major League Baseball center fielders
Pittsburgh Pirates players
Portland Beavers players
Richmond Braves players
Saraperos de Saltillo players
Sultanes de Monterrey players
21st-century African-American people
20th-century African-American sportspeople